The Pakistan Billie Jean King/Fed Cup team represents Pakistan in Billie Jean King Cup (formerly Fed Cup) tennis competition and are governed by the Pakistan Tennis Federation.

History
Pakistan competed in its first Fed Cup in 1997.  Their best result was finishing third in Group II in 1999.

Fed Cup 2011
Pakistan re-entered the Fed Cup in 2011 for the first time since 2000. Pakistan finished sixth in the Asia/Oceania Zone Group II and was represented in 2011 by its top players Sara Mahboob, Saba Aziz, Sara Mansoor and Ushna Suhail.

Fed Cup 2012
In 2012 Pakistan competed in Asia/Oceania Zone Group II played in Shenzhen, China from 30 January - 4 February. Pakistan was represented by their non-playing captain and coach Muhammad Khalid, national number one player Saba Aziz, Ushna Suhail, and Sara Mansoor.

Players

See also
Fed Cup
Pakistan Davis Cup team

References

External links

Billie Jean King Cup teams
Fed Cup
Fed Cup